Oxacis trirossi is a species of false blister beetle in the family Oedemeridae. It is found in Central America and North America.

References

Further reading

External links

 

Oedemeridae
Beetles of Central America
Beetles of North America
Beetles described in 1964
Articles created by Qbugbot